Kasie FM is a South African community radio station based in Ekurhuleni. It was founded in 1997, but started broadcasting full-time late 2007.

Coverage areas 
Eastern Ekurhuleni
Southern Ekurhuleni
Boksburg
Alberton
Germiston
Thokoza
Katlehong
Vosloorus
Parts of Eastern Johannesburg
North of Vereeniging
Wattville
KwaTsaduza

Broadcast languages
English
SeSotho
Zulu Slang

Broadcast time
24/7

Target audience
LSM Groups 2 – 7
Age Group 16 - 49
The community at large

Programme format
60% Music
40% Talk

Listenership Figures

References

External links
 Kasie FM 97.1 Website
 SAARF Website
 Sentech Website

Community radio stations in South Africa
Ekurhuleni
Mass media in Gauteng